Baoshan railway station is a railway station in Longyang District, Baoshan, Yunnan, China. It is an intermediate stop on the Dali–Ruili railway. 
The station opened on 22 July 2022.

See also
 Baoshan North railway station, a freight station in Baoshan.

References 

Railway stations in Yunnan